"Drinkin' Bone" is a song written by Casey Beathard and Kerry Kurt Phillips, and recorded by American country music artist Tracy Byrd.  It was released in August 2003 as the second single from his album The Truth About Men. It peaked at No. 7 on the United States Billboard Hot Country Singles & Tracks chart, and is his last Top 10 hit to date. It also peaked at No. 60 on the U.S. Billboard Hot 100.

Critical reception
Chuck Taylor, of Billboard magazine reviewed the song favorably by calling it "an easy sing-along" and saying that Byrd "packs a lot of good-natured personality in his delivery".

Chart positions
"Drinkin' Bone" debuted at number 55 on the U.S. Billboard Hot Country Singles & Tracks for the week of August 9, 2003.

Year-end charts

References

2003 singles
2003 songs
Tracy Byrd songs
Songs written by Casey Beathard
Song recordings produced by Billy Joe Walker Jr.
RCA Records Nashville singles
Songs written by Kerry Kurt Phillips